The Battle of Matilda, also known as the Battle of Toussaint's Island, was an early skirmish of the War of 1812 fought on September 16, 1812 between American and Canadian militia in the St. Lawrence River near the township of Matilda, in Dundas County.

Battle
On September 16, 1812, soldiers from the 1st Flank Company of the 1st Dundas Regiment under Capt. Michael Ault and Ens. Duncan Clark, as well as soldiers under Maj. Rowland Heathcote from the Royal Newfoundland Regiment, were escorting a shipment of supplies from Montreal to Kingston when they were attacked in the St. Lawrence River near Matilda by 500 American Militia, under the command of Capt. Griffin, who were hiding on Toussaint Island.

A company of the Dundas Militia under Ens. Clark landed on Presqu'ile Island just as an American force landed on the same island and a sharp exchange of fire occurred. The Americans were pinned down by accurate fire from the Dundas men, concealed amongst the bushes and trees, and they were forced to retreat back to Toussaint's Island. During their hasty retreat, one of the American boats drifted away from their force and was captured by the Dundas militia. The boat contained 7 muskets, 2 swords, and a number of necessary provisions.

Soon, drawn to the noise of battle, more Dundas militiamen arrived on Presqu'ile to bolster the Canadian positions in case of a second invasion. Col. Allan MacDonell in command of the Dundas Militia, along with Capt. Shaver and Capt. Ault were joined by two companies of Grenville Militia under Capts. Monroe and Dulmage and Lt. Richard Duncan Fraser who brought along a 9-pounder artillery piece from Prescott that had originally been captured during the Battle of the Thousand Islands. After a few rounds of fire from the cannon and muskets, the Americans abandoned the island and retreated across the St. Lawrence River to the New York side.

Order of Battle
British Forces
1st Regiment of Dundas Militia - Col. Allan MacDonell 
 1st Flank Company - Capt. Michael Ault, Ens. Duncan Clark 
 Sedentary Company - Capt. Jacob Shaver 

1st Regiment of Grenville Militia 
 1st Flank Company - Capt. Hugh Monroe (Munro)
 2nd Flank Company - Capt. Philip Dulmadge 

2nd Regiment of Grenville Militia (detachment) 
 2nd Flank Company - Lt. Richard D. Fraser   

Royal Newfoundland Fencibles - Maj. Rowland Heathcote  

American Forces
New York Militia - Capt. Giffin, Lt.. Church
Gun Boat

Aftermath
Canadian losses were one killed and several wounded, while the Americans suffered considerable losses.

References

Battles of the War of 1812 in Ontario
September 1812 events